Disney Digital 3-D is a brand name used by The Walt Disney Company to describe three-dimensional films made and released by Walt Disney Studios Motion Pictures mostly under the Walt Disney Pictures label and shown exclusively using digital projection.

Disney Digital 3-D in itself is not a presentation or a production format or technology, but rather purely a marketing concept. Films advertised as Disney Digital 3-D come from a number of sources, film, digital camera as well as animation software, and can be presented using any digital 3D technology, including RealD 3D, Dolby 3D, XpanD 3D and MasterImage 3D. There is no specific handling involved.

History

Pre-2005 Disney 3-D films
Disney had previously released two 3D animated shorts in 1953, Adventures in Music: Melody, the first American 3D animated short, and Working for Peanuts, starring Donald Duck and Chip 'n' Dale.

Disney also produced 3D films for its theme parks, including Disneyland's 3D Jamboree (1956), featuring the Mickey Mouse Club Mouseketeers and including Melody and Working for Peanuts; Magic Journeys (1982), Captain EO (1986), Muppet*Vision 3D (1991), Honey, I Shrunk the Audience (1994), It's Tough to Be a Bug! (1998), the film portion of Tokyo DisneySea's Magic Lamp Theater, and Mickey's PhilharMagic (2003).

Between 2003 and 2005, Dimension Films (then-owned by The Walt Disney Company) had made a couple of 3D films. Two of them were Spy Kids 3-D: Game Over and The Adventures of Sharkboy and Lavagirl in 3-D.

Post-2005 Disney 3-D films
The first Disney Digital 3-D film was Chicken Little, which was released in late 2005. For the release, Disney collaborated with RealD to install RealD's 3D digital projection system featuring Christie CP2000 2K DLP projectors along with silver screens for 84 screens in U.S. theaters.

The computer-animated film Chicken Little was followed by a re-release of The Nightmare Before Christmas on October 20, 2006, a 1993 stop-motion film distributed by Touchstone Pictures, was originally shot in 2D on 35mm-film to digitally remastered with the 3D version generated by Industrial Light and Magic from this source using computer technology.

In 2007, Disney re-released the film Working for Peanuts with the theatrical release of the 3D version of Meet the Robinsons.

The first live-action Disney Digital 3-D release was Hannah Montana & Miley Cyrus: Best of Both Worlds Concert, which followed in 2008. In 2009, G-Force became the first film in Disney Digital 3-D from producer Jerry Bruckheimer.

On May 29, 2009, Disney released Pixar's Up, the first Pixar film to be presented in 3-D. This film was then followed by a 3-D double feature re-release of Toy Story and Toy Story 2 on October 2, 2009, although neither of these films' animations was altered. Subsequent Pixar films, such as Toy Story 3 and Cars 2, were also released in Disney Digital 3-D.

Two of Disney's traditionally animated films were reissued with 3D conversions in 2011; The Lion King – released on August 26 internationally and on September 16 in North America, and Beauty and the Beast – limited to 13-day run in September at the El Capitan Theatre in Los Angeles for North America, as well as short runs in New Zealand, Japan, Australia, India and Spain in 2010. These re-releases were being supervised by Don Hahn, who produced both films. Beauty and the Beast in 3D received a wider release on January 13, 2012. Two more films were reissued in 3D in 2012; Finding Nemo on September 14 and Monsters, Inc. on December 19. The Little Mermaid was going to be re-released in 3D on September 13, 2013, but was cancelled due to the underperformances of the other Disney 3D re-releases until further notice. The 3D version of The Little Mermaid did, however, play for a limited engagement at the El Capitan Theatre from September to October 2013.

List of Disney Digital 3-D films

Feature films

Original releases

Reissues

Short films

Original releases

See also 

 List of 3D films
 3D film
 Digital cinema
 Digital 3D
 RealD 3D, Dolby 3D, Panavision 3D and XpanD 3D (presentation technologies)

References

External links 

 Disney's Digital Cinema Portal 
 Pixar Projection 3D D-Cinema
 "Disney Hatches Chicken Little in Digital 3D" (AWN, October 31, 2005)

Disney technology
3D imaging
3D cinema
Audiovisual introductions in 2005